Philip "Phil" Fox is an English film and television actor, known particularly for comic roles.  His appearances include Genie in the House, Maurice, People Like Us, Waking the Dead, Maxwell, Don't Tell Father, Midsomer Murders and Foyle's War. He also appeared in the film Venus alongside Peter O'Toole.

He has also appeared in many children's programmes and has a long association with producer Clive Doig, who cast him in the children's shows Eureka, The Album, Eat Your Words and See It Saw It.

He has also appeared in very many productions for BBC Radio 4, most notably in a dramatisation of the Terry Pratchett books Mort and Small Gods. He has also played the part of Maurice Horton in The Archers.

Fox played the estate agent in the first episode of Steve Coogan's comedy I'm Alan Partridge. He also played the character Baldrick in the original pilot of the Blackadder series, which was never broadcast. For the series itself, actor and TV presenter Tony Robinson was cast in the role.

Radio

References

External links 
 
 Philip Fox radio work

English male actors
Living people
Year of birth missing (living people)